The rivière du Cinq (in English: river of the five) is a tributary of the west bank of Bras Saint-Victor which flows into the Chaudière River; the latter flows northward to empty on the south shore of the St. Lawrence River.

The Rivière du Cinq flows in the administrative region of Chaudière-Appalaches, in Quebec, in Canada, in the MRC of:
 Les Appalaches Regional County Municipality: municipalities Saint-Pierre-de-Broughton and Sacré-Cœur-de-Jésus;
 Robert-Cliche Regional County Municipality: municipality of Saint-Victor.

Geography 

The main neighboring watersheds of the Five River are:
 north side: Fourchette River, Saint-Jean stream, Beaurivage River, Lessard River (Chaudière River tributary);
 east side: rivière des Fermes, Chaudière River, Bras Saint-Victor, Nadeau River, Lessard River;
 south side: Bras Saint-Victor, Prévost-Gilbert River;
 west side: Palmer East River, Prévost-Gilbert River.

The Rivière du Cinq has its source at Lac du Cinq which straddles the municipalities of Saint-Pierre-de-Broughton and Saint-Pierre-de-Broughton. This lake is located north of the village of East Broughton, north of route 112 and south-east of Mont Sainte-Marguerite.

From its source, the Rivière du Cinq flows over  divided into the following segments:
  towards the south, in Saint-Pierre-de-Broughton, to the municipal limit of Sacré-Cœur-de-Jésus;
  south to a country road;
  south (looping west) to a country road;
  towards the south-east, crossing towards the south a small lake, until a country road;
  towards the south-east, up to the Champagne route;
  southeasterly, up to the municipal limit of Saint-Victor;
  south-east to a road;
  towards the south-east, until its confluence.

The Rivière du Cinq flows on the west bank of the Bras Saint-Victor in the municipality of Saint-Victor. This last river flows into the Chaudière River in Beauceville.

Toponymy 
The toponym Rivière du Cinq was made official on June 12, 1970, at the Commission de toponymie du Québec.

See also 

 List of rivers of Quebec

References 

Rivers of Chaudière-Appalaches
Les Appalaches Regional County Municipality
Beauce-Centre Regional County Municipality